"The Teddy Bear Song" is a 1973 single written by Don Earl and Nick Nixon, and made famous by country music vocalist Barbara Fairchild. Released in December 1972, the song was Fairchild's only No. 1 song on the Billboard magazine Hot Country Singles chart in March 1973. The song also became a modest pop hit, peaking at No. 32 on the Billboard Hot 100 in June 1973.

Song background
In "The Teddy Bear Song," the female protagonist expresses such dismay over poor choices in her life—most notably, a just-ended emotional love affair that ended badly—that she'd rather revert to the innocence of a department store-window teddy bear, as spoken in the song's main tag line, "I wish I was a teddy bear ..." . The song's lyrics depict the carefree, simple existence of the teddy bear she wishes she were: not having to dream, cry or express other emotion (except for a sweetly voiced "Hi, I'm Teddy. Ain't it a lovely day?" from its pull-string-wound internal phonograph,) have regrets, or feel sorry for herself.

"The Teddy Bear Song" was the first in a series of Fairchild songs where childhood themes were used to express dismay over broken relationships and the male-dominated hierarchy of traditional relationships. For instance, the follow-up "Kid Stuff" (a No. 2 country hit for Fairchild in October 1973) plays upon the childhood game of house, where a young woman recalls a childhood memory of how she played the game with a little boy, who dominated the game and was uncaring of her feelings; those feelings are re-triggered when as an adult, she enters into a relationship where the man is the dominant figure and is either ignorant or uncaring when she objects.

Honors
"The Teddy Bear Song" was nominated for a Grammy Award for Best Country Vocal Performance by a Female in 1974, but did not win.

Chart performance

Cover versions
Several female country vocalists recorded cover versions of "The Teddy Bear Song," including Jean Shepard, Connie Smith, Diana Trask, Barbi Benton and Tanya Tucker.

References

Songs about bears
1972 singles
Barbara Fairchild songs
Columbia Records singles
1972 songs
Song recordings produced by Jerry Crutchfield